Jerome Ehlers (20 December 1958 – 9 August 2014) was an Australian actor and writer. He graduated from the National Institute of Dramatic Art (NIDA) in 1987.

Ehlers died in Sydney on 9 August 2014, after a ten-month battle with cancer.

Filmography

References

External links 
 

1958 births
Male actors from Perth, Western Australia
2014 deaths